Ali Rıza Özdarende (1876–1952) was a Turkish conservative politician.

References 

1876 births
1952 deaths
20th-century Turkish politicians
Place of death missing
People from Amasya
Republican People's Party (Turkey) politicians